Missing Link was a German pop group hailing from Mönchengladbach, that was active in the late 1980s and early 1990s.

Band History 
Missing Link was founded by Bernd Barano in 1985.  Although the band never reached the German Singles Chart, they still enjoyed great success on the radio.  In particular, on Wolfgang Roth's Schlagerrallye enjoyed much success.  With the song Together Forever, the band was able to rise up two weeks in a row, eventually becoming number one in this respect.  The song Give It later gave them the top spot repeatedly. Their album World of Fantasy sold 235,000 copies.

Discography

Album 
 1988 World of Fantasy

Singles 
 1988 Together Forever
 1989 Claim of Love
 1990 Give It
 1990 Save Me

References 

German musical groups